Stool Pigeon is a 1928 American silent crime film directed by Renaud Hoffman and starring Olive Borden, Charles Delaney and Lucy Beaumont.

Cast
 Olive Borden as Goldie 
 Charles Delaney as Jimmy Wells 
 Lucy Beaumont as Mrs. Wells 
 Louis Natheaux as Butch 
 Ernie Adams as Dropper 
 Al Hill as Red 
 Robert Wilber as Augie 
 Clarence Burton as Mike Shields

References

Bibliography
 Munden, Kenneth White. The American Film Institute Catalog of Motion Pictures Produced in the United States, Part 1. University of California Press, 1997.

External links
 

1928 films
1928 crime films
American silent feature films
American crime films
American black-and-white films
Columbia Pictures films
Films directed by Renaud Hoffman
1920s English-language films
1920s American films